District 14 (Persian:منطقه  ۱۴, also romanized as Mantaqe ye Ĉahārdah) is one of 22 central districts of Tehran Municipality is located in southeast of the Tehran, Iran. At the 2010 census, its population was 482,333, in 153,649 families.

Geography 
List of metro stations:

 Piroozi Metro Station
 Nabard Metro Station
 Kolāhdouz Metro Station
 Niroye Hāvaei Metro Station
 Ebn-Sinā Metro Station

References 

Neighbourhoods in Tehran